Waking Season is the third full-length studio album by Beverly, Massachusetts post-rock group Caspian. It is the group's first record to be produced by Matt Bayles and also their first to be released through Triple Crown Records. The album was released in CD, LP, 2XLP, and Digital Download formats on September 21, 2012 in Germany through Make My Day Records and worldwide on September 25, 2012 through Triple Crown Records. An official music video for the opening track "Waking Season" debuted on Vimeo on September 25, 2012 and was directed by Daniel Navetta. The album was later given an Australia / New Zealand release through Hobbledehoy Record Co in January 2014.  In an interview with Nothingbuthopeandpassion, guitarist Calvin Joss stated that the album is "anthemically about growth and change".

Reception

Critical reception
The album has garnered mainly positive reviews, receiving critical acclaim from various publications. The aggregate review site Metacritic assigned an average score of 89 to the album based on 5 reviews, indicating "Universal Acclaim". Spin Magazine's Christopher R. Weingarten labeled Waking Season as "the Best Post-Rock Album of the Year". Similarly, Riley Breckenridge of Alternative Press proclaimed "Waking Season is arguably one of the best records of 2012" citing the album as "fucking gorgeous".

Chart performance

Track listing
All songs written and composed by Chris Friedrich, Philip Jamieson, Calvin Joss, Erin Moran and Joe Vickers of Caspian.

Personnel
Waking Season album personnel adapted from Allmusic.

Caspian
 Philip Jamieson - Guitar, Keyboards, Synthesizers
 Chris Friedrich - Bass
 Calvin Joss - Guitar
 Erin Burke-Moran - Guitar
 Joe Vickers - Drums
Production
 Matt Bayles - Engineer, Mixing, Producer
 Will Benoit - Additional Production, Engineer
 Ed Brooks - Mastering
 Joe Tooley - Engineer
Artwork
 Philip Jamieson - Art Direction, Design, Photography
 Charles Bergquist - Cover Image

References

External links
 Official website

2012 albums
Caspian (band) albums
Albums produced by Matt Bayles
Triple Crown Records albums